Hollywood usually refers to:

 Hollywood, Los Angeles, a neighborhood in California
 Hollywood, a metonym for the cinema of the United States

Hollywood may also refer to:

Places

United States
 Hollywood District (disambiguation)
 Hollywood, Alabama, a town in Jackson County
 Hollywood, Homewood, Alabama and Hollywood Historic District, a former town and a historic district
 Hollywood, Florida, a coastal city in Broward County
 Hollywood, Georgia, an unincorporated community in Habersham County, Georgia
 Hollywood, Maryland
 Hollywood, Minnesota
 Hollywood Township, Carver County, Minnesota
 Hollywood, Mississippi
 Hollywood (Benoit, Mississippi),
 Hollywood, Missouri
 Hollywood, New Mexico, a neighborhood of Ruidoso, Lincoln County, New Mexico
 Hollywood, Portland, Oregon, a neighborhood in Portland, Oregon
 Hollywood, Luzerne County, Pennsylvania
 Hollywood, Montgomery County, Pennsylvania
 Hollywood, South Carolina
 Hollywood, Memphis, Tennessee
 Hollywood, Appomattox County, Virginia
 Hollywood, Pittsylvania County, Virginia
 Hollywood Cemetery (Richmond, Virginia)
 Hollywood, Monroe County, West Virginia
 Hollywood, Raleigh County, West Virginia
 Hollywood Boulevard, Los Angeles, California
 Florida State Road 820, Hollywood, Florida, also known as Hollywood Boulevard

Train stations 
 Hollywood station (Florida), a historic train station
 Hollywood station (Illinois), one of three stations on Metra's BNSF Railway Line in Brookfield, Illinois

Elsewhere
 Hollywood, County Wicklow, Ireland
 Holywood, County Down, Northern Ireland
 Hollywood, Worcestershire, England
 Hollywood Road, Hong Kong

Science and technology
 Hollywood (database), an RNA splicing database
 Hollywood (graphics chip)
 Hollywood (programming language), a multimedia-oriented programming language
 Hollywood (tree) (Auranticarpa rhombifolia), an Australian tree

Arts and entertainment

Fictional characters and toys
 Hollywood, a character in the series 2 Stupid Dogs
 Hollywood, a mail-offer Flutter Pony from the original My Little Pony toyline
 Hollywood Montrose, a character in the 1987 film Mannequin
 Hollywoods, a toy doll series
 Rick "Hollywood" Neven, a fighter pilot in the 1986 film Top Gun

Film and television
 Hollywood (1923 film) (1923), a silent comedy film by James Cruze
 Hollywood (British TV series) (1980), a British documentary television series about the silent era
 Hollywood (2002 film), a Kannada film starring Upendra as a robot
 "Hollywood" (Law & Order: LA) (2010), an episode of Law & Order: Los Angeles
 Hollywood (miniseries) (2020), an American television miniseries from Netflix

Music
 Hollywood, a 1990s female UK/Swedish electro pop duo, part of the Romo movement
 Hollywood Records, an American record label part of the Disney Music Group

Albums
 Hollywood (Circle album) (2008)
 Hollywood (Flavor Flav album) (2006)
 Hollywood (Little Birdy album) (2006)
 Hollywood (Jamie Foxx album) (2015)
 Hollywood (Johnny Hallyday album) (1979)
 Hollywood (The Puppini Sisters album) (2011)
 Hollywood (Tercer Cielo album) (2008)
 Hollywood (EP), an EP by Angus & Julia Stone
 Hollywood, album by Nana Mouskouri
 Hollywood, a 1977 album in the Véronique Sanson discography

Songs
 "Hollywood" (The Cranberries song) 
 "Hollywood" (Gorillaz song)
 "Hollywood" (Jay-Z song)
 "Hollywood" (Kasey Chambers song)
 "Hollywood" (Madonna song)
 "Hollywood" (Marina and the Diamonds song)
 "Hollywood" (Michael Bublé song) 
 "Hollywood" (Car Seat Headrest song)
 "Hollywood (Africa)", a 1985 song by Red Hot Chili Peppers
 "Hollywood (Down on Your Luck)", a 1981 song by Thin Lizzy
 "Hollywood/I Am the Resurrection", a double A-side single by Codeine Velvet Club (2009)
 "Hollywood", by After Midnight Project from Let's Build Something to Break (2009)
 "Hollywood", by Alabama from Feels So Right (1981)
 "Hollywood", by America from Holiday (1974)
 "Hollywood", by Bilal from the unreleased album Love for Sale
 "Hollywood", by Boz Scaggs from Down Two Then Left (1977)
 "Hollywood", by Collective Soul from Afterwords (2007)
 "Hollywood", by Daniel Powter from Daniel Powter (2005)
 "Hollywood", by Dog's Eye View from Daisy (1997)
 "Hollywood", by Jonas Brothers from the album Jonas Brothers (2006)
 "Hollywood", by Labelle from Pressure Cookin' (1973)
 "Hollywood" and "Hollywood's Dead", unreleased songs by Lana Del Rey
 "Hollywood", by Lewis Capaldi from Divinely Uninspired to a Hellish Extent (2019)
 "Hollywood", by Nickelback from Silver Side Up (2001)
 "Hollywood", an unreleased song recorded by Pink Floyd
 "Hollywood", by P.O.D. from The Fundamental Elements of Southtown (1999)
 "Hollywood", by Rick James from Come Get It! (1978)
 "Hollywood", by Rufus and Chaka Khan from Ask Rufus (1977)
 "Hollywood", by The Runaways from Queens of Noise (1977)
 "Hollywood", by Shooting Star from Hang On for Your Life (1981)
 "Hollywood", by Silverchair on "Without You" (2002)
 "Hollywood", by Smile.dk from Future Girls (2000)
 "Hollywood", by Streetheart
 "Hollywood", by Suzi Quatro from Suzi ... and Other Four Letter Words (1979)
 "Hollywood", by The Veronicas on "Untouched" (2007)
 "Hollywood", by Waterloo & Robinson (1974)

Other arts
 Hollywood (video game), a 1995 creative writing computer game
 Hollywood (Bukowski novel), a 1989 novel by Charles Bukowski
 Hollywood (Vidal novel), a 1990 novel by Gore Vidal

Brands and businesses
 Hollywood (cigarette), a Brazilian brand of cigarettes
 Hollywood.com, an American entertainment news website
 Hollywood Candy Company or Hollywood Brands, a defunct American confectionery company
 Hollywood Chewing Gum, a French chewing gum brand
 Hollywood Video, a former DVD and video game rental shop chain

People

Surname
 Edwin L. Hollywood (1892–1958), American film director
 Gary Hollywood (born 1979), Scottish actor
 Jesse James Hollywood (born 1980), American convicted murderer
 Matt Hollywood (born 1973), American indie rock musician
 Paul Hollywood (born 1966), English chef

Nickname, ring or stage name
 Hollywood Bob Holly, a name used briefly by professional wrestler Bob Holly (born 1963)
 Hollywood Fats, American blues guitarist Michael Leonard Mann (1954–1986)
 Hollywood Hogan or Hulk Hogan, ring names of American professional wrestler Terry Gene Bollea (born 1953)
 Hollywood Zakoshisyoh, Japanese comedian Shigeki Nakazawa (born 1974)
 Hollywood (wrestler) (born 1969), American professional wrestler
 Scott Scurlock (1955–1996), American bank robber nicknamed the "Hollywood Bandit" or simply "Hollywood"
 Thomas Henderson (American football) (born 1953), American former National Football League player
 Tom Marechek (born 1968), Canadian former lacrosse player

See also

 
 Holli Would, a character in the film Cool World
 Holly wood, wood from a holly plant
 Hollywood and the video game industry
 Holly Wood (disambiguation)
 Holy Wood (disambiguation)
 Palo santo (disambiguation) (Spanish: "Holy Wood")
 Hollywood Blonds, name used by several professional wrestling tag teams
 The Hollywood Flames, American R&B vocal group in the 1950s
 Tinsel town (disambiguation)